Mirali mausoleum is a mausoleum in the Ashaghi Veysalli village of the Fuzuli District of Azerbaijan. The mausoleum was constructed in the beginning of the 14th century. The name of the mausoleum is famous in legends. It was located near an old road between Beylagan and Barda, a stone's throw from the center of Fizuli Rayon.

Architecture
Mirali mausoleum is a tower-type mausoleum. Narrow cylindrical housing of the mausoleum with diameter of 5 meters and a conic ending of 15 meters heights is built from rows of thoroughly dressed and bedded stone. A well-composed housing with a conic marquee, which is covered with excellently dressed stone plates and decorated with a portal with shaped margin and a woven twist under foundation of the marquee, stands on a short, three-laddered pedestal. The marquee is constructed from thoroughly bedded stone plates.

References

Towers completed in the 14th century
Mausoleums in Azerbaijan
Tourist attractions in Azerbaijan
Islamic architecture
Fuzuli District